Below are the full rosters and coaching staff of the eight Pioneer League teams.

Northern Division

Billings Mustangs

Great Falls Voyagers

Idaho Falls Chukars

Missoula PaddleHeads

Southern Division

Boise Hawks

Grand Junction Jackalopes

Ogden Raptors

Rocky Mountain Vibes

Pioneer League (baseball)